Factory Girl is a traditional song. It has been performed by The Roches, The Chieftains with Sinéad O'Connor, Lisa O'Neill with Radie Peat, Margaret Barry, Rhiannon Giddens, and Eric Burdon.

Its lyrics tell the story of a youngster who meets a poor girl on her way to her job at a factory. She initially resists the singer's advances due to her class pride and ability to support herself. Endings of the song vary; in some, the two characters end up marrying, but in others, the girl ultimately rejects the suitor. In Gidden's version, the lyrics are rewritten so that the song ends with the collapse of the factory and death of the titular girl, in reference to disasters such as the 2013 Dhaka garment factory collapse.

References

Eric Burdon songs
Irish folk songs
Year of song unknown
Songwriter unknown